Pointe d'Areu is a mountain of Haute-Savoie, France. It lies in the Aravis Range, above Oëx in the Arve valley, and has an altitude of  2478 metres above sea level.

Mountains of the Alps
Mountains of Haute-Savoie